County Route 535 (CR 535) is a county highway in the U.S. state of New Jersey. The highway extends  from Logan Avenue (where it becomes CR 635), at the boundary between Trenton and Hamilton Township in Mercer County to an interchange with U.S. Route 9 (US 9) and Route 35 in South Amboy, Middlesex County.

The road serves as the main street through the communities of Cranbury, South River and Sayreville, while also passing through rural areas on the outskirts of Mercer and southern Middlesex counties. At various points, it is locally known as East State Street, Edinburg Road, Old Trenton Road, Cranbury-South River Road, Main Street, Washington Road, and Raritan Street.

Route description

The designation of CR 535 picks up East State Street at the Trenton city line and heads northeast into the Bromley neighborhood of Hamilton. Now the East State Street Extension and maintained by Hamilton Township, CR 535 meets Interstate 295 (I-295) with limited access at exit 64. Traffic traveling southbound on CR 535 (traveling geographically north for this brief stretch) has a ramp leading to I-295 north toward US 1, while southbound traffic on the freeway can exit onto CR 535 north. County maintenance resumes at this point and CR 535 stays on this road for just  before reaching a five-way intersection with Route 533 (Quakerbridge Road north of the intersection, White Horse-Mercerville Road south of it) and Nottingham Way, which is CR 618 as it travels southeast away from the intersection toward Hamilton Square.

Having regained its northeast direction, CR 535 moves through this intersection and becomes Edinburg Road. At a traffic signal with Paxson Avenue, the road widens to two lanes in each direction. It leaves Hamilton for West Windsor, and bumps up against Mercer County Community College on the left. Just beyond the college is Mercer County Park, which is accessible through South Post Road (CR 602) or through the park's official west entrance after CR 535's reduction to one lane each way. Just beyond the park entrance, the route has a short concurrency with CR 526, which comes from Robbinsville Township to the south. Less than  later, CR 526 turns due north again and heads for Princeton Junction while Windsor Road (CR 641) travels southeast. CR 535 continues to the northeast as Old Trenton Road, crossing into East Windsor. In East Windsor, it intersects CR 571, with the entrance to the Route 133 bypass of Hightstown visible to the right. CR 535 crosses the Millstone River and into Middlesex County.

CR 535 is now traversing Cranbury, traveling for a just under  before reaching the township's Main Street. It turns left toward the downtown area, while CR 539 comes from the right on South Main Street and ends while CR 685 continues down Old Trenton Road to its terminus at US 130. Once through Cranbury, CR 535 turns right onto Plainsboro Road and shortly thereafter, merges into another short concurrency, this time with US 130.

CR 535 enters South Brunswick Township. Though signed at various points as Cranbury-South River Road, South River Road and Cranbury Road, it is officially only the latter. It meets Route 32, providing access to the Turnpike as it passes to the right. Originally all traffic to and from the Turnpike's exit 8A used Route 32, but vehicles leaving the Turnpike and not traveling towards Jamesburg now exit onto CR 535. CR 535 runs along the boundary between South Brunswick and Monroe and then crosses under the Turnpike. Later it enters East Brunswick completely.

CR 535 is one of the main thoroughfares of East Brunswick, along with Route 18, Ryders Lane (CR 617), and Dunhams Corner Road. The latter branches off at the same point CR 535 moves all the way into the township, banks hard to the right at East Brunswick Community Park just shy of the Turnpike, then rejoins CR 535. CR 535 intersects Ryders Lane, passes East Brunswick High School on the right, then approaches a complex interchange with Route 18, providing access to New Brunswick and the Turnpike at exit 9 to the northwest, Old Bridge and shore points to the south, and Spotswood via CR 613 (Summerhill Road). CR 535 itself continues north and crosses into the borough of South River at the crossing of the Old Bridge Turnpike (CR 527).

CR 535 crosses the South River via the Veteran's Memorial Bridge and into Sayreville. Though Main Street (CR 670) breaks off, CR 535 (Washington Road) serves the more densely populated southern half of the borough (through the community of Parlin), as well as Sayreville War Memorial High School and Sayreville Middle School. CR 535 enters the outskirts of South Amboy though it comes up just short of the border between the two municipalities.  later, it crosses underneath the Garden State Parkway and reaches its former northern terminus, an intersection with the other end of Sayreville's Main Street. CR 535 becomes Raritan Street continues another mile to enter South Amboy and ends an interchange with the concurrency of US 9 and Route 35 on approach to the Edison Bridge and the Victory Bridge, respectively. Raritan Street continues ahead through South Amboy as CR 686 Spur.

Major intersections

See also

References

External links

New Jersey 5xx Routes (Dan Moraseski)
CR 535 pictures

535
535
535